The 2016–17 VCU Rams men's basketball team represented Virginia Commonwealth University during the 2016–17 NCAA Division I men's basketball season. The Rams, led by second-year head coach Will Wade, played their home games at Stuart C. Siegel Center as members of the Atlantic 10 Conference. They finished the season 26–9, 14–4 in A-10 play to finish in second place. In the A-10 tournament, they beat George Mason and Richmond before losing to Rhode Island in the championship game. They received an at-large bid to the NCAA tournament as the No. 10 seed in the West region where they lost in the First round to Saint Mary's.

Following the season, head coach Will Wade left VCU to take the head coaching position at LSU following the firing of Johnny Jones. Wade had served has the head coach for the last two seasons making him VCU's shortest tenured head coach since Benny Dees. On March 21, 2017, the school hired Rice head coach Mike Rhoades, who had served as associate head coach under Shaka Smart from 2009 to 2014.

Previous season
The Rams finished the 2015–16 season with a record of 25–11, 14–4 in A-10 play to finish in a tie for a first-place. In the A-10 tournament, the Rams lost to Saint Joseph's in the championship game. The Rams received an at-large bid to the NCAA tournament where they beat Oregon State in the first round before losing to Oklahoma in the second round.

Preseason
The Rams were picked to finish third in the A-10 preseason poll. Mo Allie-Cox was selected to the All-A-10 second team while JeQuan Lewis was selected to the third team. Cox and Lewis were also selected to the All-Defensive team.

Offseason

Departures

Incoming transfers

2016 recruiting class

2017 Recruiting class

Roster

Schedule and results 

|-
!colspan=12 style=| Exhibition

|-
!colspan=12 style=| Non-conference regular season

|-
!colspan=12 style=| Atlantic 10 regular season

|-
!colspan=12 style=| Atlantic 10 tournament

|-
!colspan=12 style=| NCAA tournament
|-

|-

References

VCU
VCU Rams men's basketball seasons
VCU Rams men's basketball
VCU Rams men's basketball
VCU